Park Jung-ah (also spelled as Park Jeong-ah, Park JungA; February 24, 1981) is a South Korean entertainer.

Career

2000-present: Career beginnings, breakthrough success and Jewelry
Park graduated from Dongduk Women's University with a bachelor's degree in Applied Musicology and is also able to play the piano.

First debuting as a member of the girl group Jewelry in 2001, she became the group leader. In 2003, she debuted as an actress and has since appeared in a handful of movies and dramas.

Since Jewelry went on hiatus, Park took the opportunity to debut as a solo singer. Her first solo album Yeah was released in the fall of 2006, showing an edgier side that Jewelry single "Superstar" hinted at. The title song Produced and Co-Written by Hit American Producers Ian (iRok) Scott and Mark (MJ) Jackson A.K.A. MJ&iRoK was her first single, and it allowed Park to become more of a rock singer. The album also featured production from #1 Billboard Producer, Eddie Galan of Mach 1 Music. To move away from the manufactured pop image she developed in Jewelry, she has performed this single live at every performance, and it has subsequently made the song a strong chart hit.

From November 2006 to 2009, she had been hosting her own radio show, On a Starry Night.

In 2013, Jung-ah left Star Empire and entered a new contract with WM Company. Their new partnership was announced on May 10, 2013.

In June 2014, Park released Because of You which is part of South Korean drama Doctor Stranger's OST.

On December 15, 2015 Jellyfish Entertainment released their Jelly Christmas 2015 – 4랑 single album featuring the song, "Love In The Air". The announced participating the Jellyfish artists were Park Jung-ah, Seo In-guk, VIXX, and former K-pop Star 4 contestant Park Yoon-ha. The single placed at 14 on the digital Gaon Chart.

Park participated in Jellyfish Entertainment's winter project, Jelly Christmas 2016, with her label mates Seo In-guk, VIXX, Gugudan, Park Yoon-ha, Kim Gyu-sun, Kim Ye-won and Jiyul. The title track, "Falling" was released digitally on  December 13, 2016.

Personal life 
Park was diagnosed with thyroid cancer and received surgery to remove a cancerous tumor in May 2013.

On May 15, 2016, Park married pro-golfer Jeon Sang-woo and gave birth to a daughter in March, 2019.

Filmography

Film

Television series

Discography

Studio albums
 Yeah (released on August 25, 2006)

Collaborations

Show hosting

Television show

Radio show

Awards and nominations

References

External links 

 
 
 
 

Jellyfish Entertainment artists
Jewelry (group) members
Japanese-language singers
K-pop singers
South Korean women pop singers
South Korean women singers
South Korean dance musicians
South Korean female idols
South Korean film actresses
South Korean television actresses
South Korean television presenters
South Korean women television presenters
South Korean radio presenters
South Korean humanitarians
Dongduk Women's University alumni
People from Yeongcheon
1981 births
Living people
South Korean women radio presenters